Arrested development is a medical term for stoppage of physical or mental development. 

Arrested development or Arrested Development  may also refer to:
 Arrested Development, an American sitcom
 Arrested Development (group), an American alternative hip-hop group
 Arrested Development (radio series), a 2000 UK radio series

See also 
 Developmental disorder, a group of psychiatric conditions originating in childhood that involve serious impairment
 Neoteny, the retention of juvenile characteristics in the adult